"Say I" is a song by American singer Christina Milian. It was written by Jazmine Sullivan, Jay Jenkins (at the time Young Jeezy, now simply known as Jeezy), Andre Lyon, and Marcello Valenzano and produced by Lyon and Valenzano under their production moniker Cool & Dre for her third studio album So Amazin' (2006). The song features additional vocals by Jeezy and is built around a sample of "Clean Up Your Own Yard" (1973) by American soul singer Jackie Moore. Due to the inclusion of the sample, its writers Bunny Sigler and Phil Hurtt are also credited as songwriters.

The song was released by Island Def Jam as the album's lead single in February 2006. It reached the top five in the Wallonian region of Belgium, the Netherlands, and the United Kingdom, and peaked at number 21 on the US Billboard Hot 100. An accompanying music video, directed by Ray Kay, was filmed in Los Angeles in February 2006. The official remix of "Say I" features rapper Juelz Santana, which is a bonus track in the Japanese edition of the album.

Music video
A music video for "Say I" was directed by Norwegian photographer Ray Kay and filmed over the weekend of February 16, 2006 in Los Angeles. Behind the scenes footage of the making of the video aired on March 1 on BET's making of series Access Granted.

Track listings

Notes
 denotes additional producer

Charts

Weekly charts

Year-end charts

Release history

References

External links
 

2005 songs
2006 singles
Christina Milian songs
Jeezy songs
Mercury Records singles
Music videos directed by Ray Kay
Song recordings produced by Cool & Dre
Songs written by Bunny Sigler
Songs written by Jazmine Sullivan
Songs written by Cool (record producer)
Songs written by Dre (record producer)